George Weymouth (Waymouth) was an English explorer of the area now occupied by the state of Maine.

Voyages 
George Weymouth was a native of Cockington, Devon, who spent his youth studying shipbuilding and mathematics.

In 1602 Weymouth was hired to seek a northwest passage to India by the recently formed East India Company. He sailed the ship Discovery 300 miles into Hudson Strait but turned back on July 26, as the year was far spent and many men were ill. Weymouth reached Dartmouth on September 5, 1602.

1605 expedition
In March 1605 Thomas Arundell, 1st Baron Arundell of Wardour and Henry Wriothesley, 3rd Earl of Southampton sent Captain Weymouth to found a colony in Virginia under the ruse of searching again for a northwest passage. Weymouth sailed from England on March 31, 1605 on the ship Archangel and landed near Monhegan off the coast of Maine on May 17, 1605. 

A report of the voyage, written by James Rosier (hired by Arundell to make detailed observations), was published soon after the expedition's return. The pamphlet described the physical resources available to settlers on the islands and coast of Maine (harbors, rivers, soil,  trees, wild fruit and vegetables, and so forth). James Rosier, would write that Monhegan was "woody, growen with Firre, Birch, Oke and Beech, as farre as we say along the shore; and so likely to be within. On the verge grow Gooseberries, Strawberries, Wild pease, and Wilde rose bushes." 

The compelling part of the story, however, is the crew's encounters with the Natives, which began eleven days after the Archangel first moored among the Georges Islands, on May 30, 1605, as the ship was anchored in Muscongus Bay and the captain and 13 men had gone off in the shallop to explore. The report tells how the remaining crew had a chance encounter that afternoon with a hunting party, developed a sign language with them, and over several days encouraged their trust with gifts and then trade.

On his return, Weymouth joined in the hospitality, offering the Natives bread and peas which they were unfamiliar with and amazing them with a sword magnetized with a lodestone.  After three days of hospitality and trading, Rosier suggested that the crew visit their homes to trade. Rosier wrote that cultivating their trust was part of the plan to colonize once they had decided that the land was prime for European settlement.  On June 3, as they themselves had suggested, the English set out to visit their homes. They became skittish when a large assembly came to escort them and decided not to go. Rosier claimed that they then decided to kidnap a number of Natives, from their belief that the Natives intended mischief. 

These things considered, we began to joyne them in the ranke of other Salvages, who have beene by travellers in most discoveries found very ; never attempting mischiefe, until by some remisnesse, fit opportunity affordeth them certain ability to execute the same. Wherefore after good advise taken we determined so soone as we could to take some of them, least (being suspicious we had discovered their plots) they should absent themselves from us.

On the next day, they abducted five Natives, three by duplicity and two by having the crewmen force the Natives onto the lower decks. In discussing the forcible kidnapping of two Natives, Rosier noted that the kidnapping had been long planned, saying that they would have resorted to harsher methods to secure their captives because the capture of Natives was "a matter of great importance for the full accomplement of our voyage". The idea was undoubtedly conceived by the entrepreneurs back in England as a way to become familiar with the land and inhabitants that they intended to colonize. The plan operated, however, at cross-purposes with their attempt to create good will. Weymouth and his crew made no secret of their abductions, though among Native communities they were thought to have killed instead of kidnapped the five Natives; not long after Weymouth's crew had left, French explorer Samuel de Champlain, sailing from the north, met a Native man named Anaffon, a minor trader in furs, at Monhegan Island on July 31. The Native told Champlain of a group of Englishmen who had been fishing there not long before and "under cover of friendship" had killed five Natives of the area. 

Weymouth returned to England in mid June. All five of his captives were taken to England. Their names were recorded as Amoret, Tahanedo, sagamore Manedo, Sketwarroes, and Sassacomoit, a servant;  Weymouth presented the latter three to Sir Ferdinando Gorges, governor of Plymouth Fort, piquing his interest in exploration. Gorges was an investor in the Weymouth voyage and became the chief promoter of the scheme when Arundell withdrew from the project. 

In a book published in 1658, a decade after Gorges had died, and presumably written when Gorges was quite old, Gorges wrote of his delight in Weymouth's kidnapping, and named Squanto as one of the three given over to him.

Captain George Weymouth, having failed at finding a Northwest Passage, happened into a River on the Coast of America, called Pemmaquid, from whence he brought five of the Natives, three of whose names were Manida, Sellwarroes, and Tasquantum, whom I seized upon, they were all of one Nation, but of severall parts, and severall Families; This accident must be acknowledged the meanes under God of putting on foote, and giving life to all our Plantations ....

Circumstantial evidence makes nearly impossible the claim that it was Squanto among the three taken by Gorges, and no modern historian entertains this as fact. The abductions were an intentional policy of the English entrepreneurs. Gorges, chief among the entrepreneur in Englands, wanted to both impress on the Natives the superiority of English technology and encourage colonists to emigrate; additionally, colonial entrepreneurs wanted to learn as much as they could from their captives about the lands and peoples of the New World. The entrepreneurs displayed their captives prominently to attract financing and public support for their commercial project. It is more difficult to understand how they continued the policy after the experience with these first captives. Two of the captives, Manedo and Sassacomit, were sent back with Captain Henry Chollons in 1606, but the ship was intercepted by the Spanish. Manedo was lost, but Sassacomit, seriously injured, was lodged in a Spanish prison. Sassacomit was forced to escape his bondage in Spain and make his way to England before he could be returned to his home in what is now Maine. Two other of the kidnapped Abenaki were returned to Maine in connection with Gorges's plan to found a trading colony there. His idea was that the returned Abenaki would act as liaison between the English settlers and the local population. Instead of providing a safe entrée for the English escorting him, however, one of the two, Skidwarres, had to be forced to identify himself so that the Natives would stop the attack they made on the English. Skidwarres once home, did not persuade the Abenaki to trade with the English but instead warned them to be wary of them. The conduct of Skidwarres and fellow abductee Tahanedo, nurtured the mistrust that would eventually lead to the failure of the Sagadahoc colony. This experience did not deter Gorges or other English entrepreneurs from continuing the practice of abducting local men to be transported to England, abducting Natives in the Cape Cod area as well. 

Weymouth named the island Saint George after the patron saint of England.

In Britain, the North American tree species Pinus strobus is referred to as the "Weymouth Pine", in honor of George Weymouth.

In July 2005 the Historical Society of Thomaston, Maine celebrated the 400 anniversary of Weymouth's voyage to Maine.

Notes

References

Bibliography

  Online (via HathiTrust): Multiple copies. ("The Settlement of Boston Bay" is found in Volume 1, pp. 1–360. The chapter on Tisquantum is found at pp. 23–44.)
 
  (The work consists of first-hand accounts of early voyages to the New World, with introduction and notes by Burrage.)
 
  In three volumes, online, at the Internet Archive, as follows: Volume 1 consists of Baxter's memoir of Sir Ferdinando Gorges and A briefe relation of the discovery and plantation of New England ... (London: J. Haviland for W. Bladen, 1622). Volume 2 includes A briefe narration of the original undertakings of the advancement of plantation into the parts of American... by ... Sir Ferdinando Gorges ... (London: E. Brudenell, for N. Brook, 1658) as well as other works of Gorges and his son Thomas Gorges. Volume 3 is devoted to Gorges's letters and other papers, 1596–1646.
 
  Hosted by Internet Archives: Volume I; 1567–35 (1880); Volume II: 1604–1610 (1878); Volume III: 1611–1618 (1882).
 
  (William C. Sturtevant, general editor.)
 
 
  The original imprint was "In fower parts, each containing five bookes". All four volumes (parts) are hosted online by the Library of Congress The 1905–07 reproduction was printed in 20 volumves (one for each "book"): 
  The pamphlet was reprinted in an 1877 edition hosted online by HathiTrust.

External links
A TRUE RELATION OF CAPTAIN GEORGE WEYMOUTH HIS VOYAGE. MADE THIS PRESENT YEERE 1605

English explorers
People of colonial Maine
Year of death unknown
People of pre-statehood Maine
17th-century deaths
Year of birth unknown